Comox refers to these Canadian things:

Places 

Comox, British Columbia, a town (and peninsula) on Vancouver Island
CFB Comox, a nearby military base
Comox Lake, a nearby body of water
Comox (electoral district), a provincial electoral district, 1871–1986

Other uses 
Comox people (or Kʼómoks), an indigenous group in British Columbia
Comox language, their Coast Salish language
K'ómoks First Nation (or the Comox Indian Band), the government of the insular Comox
the mainland Comox:
 Sliammon
 Klahoose
 Homalco
Comox (steamboat), 1891–1920
HMCS Comox, several naval vessels

See also
Comox Land District, one of the 59 cadastral subdivisions of British Columbia
Comox Valley, a region of British Columbia
Comox Valley Regional District, a regional district of British Columbia
Comox Valley (provincial electoral district), a provincial electoral district since 1991
Comox—Atlin, a federal electoral district 1903–1914
Comox–Alberni, a federal electoral district 1914–1976, 1987–1996
Comox—Powell River, a federal electoral district 1976–1987
Comox Glacier